Scott Koblish was born on May 28, 1970, in upstate New York, and has hundreds of comics credits at both Marvel Comics and DC Comics.

Education
Scott Koblish attended The Kubert School of Cartooning and Graphic Art when he was nine years old. He graduated from The School of Visual Arts in Manhattan with a BFA in Cartooning and Illustration.

Bibliography
Scott Koblish began working at Marvel Comics through an apprentice program called the Romita Raiders in 1993. By summer ’93, he was working freelance as an inker, and for the next 15 years he inked hundreds of comics such as G.I. Joe, the Punisher, Electra, Excalibur, Thor, Captain America, the Avengers, the Fantastic Four, and Nomad. Freelancing for DC Comics, Koblish inked on multiple titles such as O.M.A.C. (over Keith Giffen) and The Brave and the Bold, Worlds’ Finest and Final Crisis: Legion of Three Worlds over George Pérez.  He inked the Marvel Comics Star Trek/X-Men crossover “Second Contact”, and was the inker on Captain America,.

Beginning in 2008, Scott Koblish began pencilling projects with The Weapon, a mini-series from Platinum Comics. He pencilled and inked the character Deadpool for 6 years. Koblish pencilled various Disney Magazine Projects, notably the "Jet Pack Pets" for Disney and drew Stan Lee Media's the "7th Portal".

In 2018, Chronicle Books Published The Many Deaths of Scott Koblish, cartoon strips by the artist in which he lampoons his own demise.

Koblish pencilled Deadpool for 6 years, drawing the art for the cover to Deadpool #27 which set the Guinness World Record for most characters to appear on a comic book cover.

Koblish, along with Gerry Duggan and Brian Posehn started work on a comic for Image called The Secret History of the War on Weed, which debuted on April 20, 2022.

Personal life
Scott Koblish has a child and is married to Jillian Koblish  He resides in Los Angeles, CA.

References

External links
Scott Koblish's Marvel Comics
Scott Koblish's DC Comics

American comics artists
American graphic novelists
Living people
1970 births